Sadsbury Township is a township in east central Lancaster County, Pennsylvania, United States. The population was 3,547 at the 2020 census.

History
In 1744, Sadsbury Township was split into two; the western part was organized as Bart Township and the eastern part remained Sadsbury Township.

The Mercer's Mill Covered Bridge was listed on the National Register of Historic Places in 1980.

Politics

Media
WNUZ-LP 92.9 FM - Community Radio Station, Based in the Gap area of Sadsbury Township; which is located in the Northeast corner of the Township. Station Website

Geography
Unincorporated communities in the township include Simmonstown, Smyrna, and Coopersville.

Demographics

As of the census of 2000, there were 3,025 people, 880 households, and 760 families living in the township.  The population density was 153.4 people per square mile (59.2/km).  There were 899 housing units at an average density of 45.6/sq mi (17.6/km).  The racial makeup of the township was 99.01% White, 0.26% African American, 0.07% Native American, 0.33% Asian, and 0.33% from two or more races. Hispanic or Latino of any race were 0.40% of the population.

There were 880 households, out of which 44.1% had children under the age of 18 living with them, 78.5% were married couples living together, 4.4% had a female householder with no husband present, and 13.6% were non-families. 11.6% of all households were made up of individuals, and 5.0% had someone living alone who was 65 years of age or older.  The average household size was 3.44 and the average family size was 3.75.

In the township the population was spread out, with 35.5% under the age of 18, 9.1% from 18 to 24, 24.5% from 25 to 44, 21.4% from 45 to 64, and 9.6% who were 65 years of age or older.  The median age was 30 years. For every 100 females, there were 100.1 males.  For every 100 females age 18 and over, there were 102.8 males.

The median income for a household in the township was $53,750, and the median income for a family was $56,034. Males had a median income of $35,779 versus $29,545 for females. The per capita income for the township was $17,956.  About 8.0% of families and 12.7% of the population were below the poverty line, including 21.0% of those under age 18 and 8.5% of those age 65 or over.

References

External links

Populated places established in 1691
Townships in Lancaster County, Pennsylvania
1691 establishments in Pennsylvania
Townships in Pennsylvania